Lee Kang-uk (born March 19, 1994) is a South Korean football player who plays for Changwon City FC as a forward.

Career
Lee Kang-uk joined the J2 League club Thespakusatsu Gunma in 2016.

References

External links

1994 births
Living people
South Korean footballers
Association football forwards
J2 League players
Thespakusatsu Gunma players
South Korean expatriate footballers
South Korean expatriate sportspeople in Japan
Expatriate footballers in Japan
Korea National League players